Pablo Amo Aguado (born 15 January 1978) is a Spanish retired footballer who played as a central defender, currently manager of the Spain under-18 team.

In a career undermined by injuries, he amassed La Liga totals of 67 matches and five goals over eight seasons, mainly with Deportivo de La Coruña. He started playing professionally with Sporting de Gijón.

Playing career
Born in Madrid, Amo started playing professional football with Sporting de Gijón, representing the Asturians in three Segunda División seasons. Signing with Deportivo de La Coruña for 2002–03 he went very much unnoticed until the 2007–08 campaign (serving two loans in the process), when he excelled in a five-man defence devised by coach Miguel Ángel Lotina.

On 13 January 2008, in his first match for Depor in three years, Amo scored and was sent off in a 3–4 away loss against Villarreal CF, also managing to find the net in a 2–0 home win over FC Barcelona three months later. However, he spent the following season on the sidelines, bothered by an Achilles tendon ailment.

Amo was deemed surplus to requirements at Deportivo, and on 3 August 2009 he joined Real Zaragoza on a two-year deal. His only season was again severely hindered by constant physical problems, but his team retained their La Liga status.

On 21 July 2010, aged 32, Amo moved abroad for the first time, signing with Panserraikos F.C. in Greece for one year. In the summer of 2011 he joined Cypriot First Division club Olympiakos Nicosia but, again plagued by injuries, was released in the following transfer window.

Coaching career
After retiring, Amo worked as José Francisco Molina's assistant in the Association of Spanish Footballers; the duo were brought in to assemble a team of unemployed players in a tour of China and Spain during August-September 2012. The following year, he was hired by the Evergrande Football School in China, being responsible for developing young children.
 
In the summer of 2014, Amo moved to Sydney, Australia, where he worked as a youth manager. He also intended to open an academy with an Australian friend.

Amo reunited with Molina in May 2016, being part of his staff at Indian Super League club ATK. On 14 November of the following year, they joined Atlético San Luis in the Ascenso MX ahead of the Clausura tournament. 

In October 2018, Amo paired with Molina's at the Royal Spanish Football Federation, after the latter had been appointed sporting director. On 19 December 2019, the former was named new head coach of the Spain national under-18 team.

References

External links

1978 births
Living people
Spanish footballers
Footballers from Madrid
Association football defenders
La Liga players
Segunda División players
Segunda División B players
Sporting de Gijón B players
Sporting de Gijón players
Deportivo de La Coruña players
Real Valladolid players
Recreativo de Huelva players
Real Zaragoza players
Super League Greece players
Panserraikos F.C. players
Cypriot First Division players
Olympiakos Nicosia players
Spanish expatriate footballers
Expatriate footballers in Greece
Expatriate footballers in Cyprus
Spanish expatriate sportspeople in Greece
Spanish expatriate sportspeople in Cyprus
Spanish football managers
Spanish expatriate sportspeople in China
Spanish expatriate sportspeople in Australia
Spanish expatriate sportspeople in India
Spanish expatriate sportspeople in Mexico